GoodNotes is a note-taking application developed by GoodNotes Limited for use on iOS, iPadOS, and macOS. The app is designed for taking handwritten notes and annotating PDF documents on iOS devices. GoodNotes 5, the latest version of the app, offers an updated user interface, improved search functionality, and additional features.

Features 
The features of GoodNotes revolve around its primary use, note-taking. The app organizes notes into virtual folders and notebooks, and includes the functionality to import PDF or other document types into notebooks. Other features include link sharing collaboration, in-document searching and iCloud Sync.

The following features have been added in GoodNotes 5, the current version of GoodNotes:

 no limitation to levels of folders and subfolders;
 Global search: search handwritten notes, typed text, notebook titles, and PDF files simultaneously;
 Quicknotes: start a new note upon launching the app.

References 

 IOS software
 MacOS software
IPadOS software
 Note-taking software